Demadiana is a genus of Australian araneomorph spiders in the family Arkyidae, first described by Embrik Strand in 1929.

Species
 it contains six species:
Demadiana carrai Framenau, Scharff & Harvey, 2010 – Australia (New South Wales)
Demadiana cerula (Simon, 1908) – Australia (Western Australia)
Demadiana complicata Framenau, Scharff & Harvey, 2010 – Australia (Queensland)
Demadiana diabolus Framenau, Scharff & Harvey, 2010 – Australia (South Australia, Tasmania)
Demadiana milledgei Framenau, Scharff & Harvey, 2010 – Australia (New South Wales, Victoria)
Demadiana simplex (Karsch, 1878) – Southern Australia

References

Araneomorphae genera
Arkyidae
Spiders of Australia
Taxa named by Embrik Strand